Joo Hae-eun (born 17 January 1994) is a South Korean actress and model. She is best known for her main role in Just Dance as Yang Na-young. She also appeared in movies such as Swing Kids, The Spy Gone North. She is also known for her supporting role in drama Love with Flaws as Lee Joo-hee.

Filmography

Television series

Film

Music video

References

External links 
 
 
 

1994 births
Living people
21st-century South Korean actresses
South Korean female models
South Korean television actresses
South Korean film actresses